Fossa navicularis magna (also known as pharyngeal fossa or phyaryngeal fovela) is a variant bony depression found at the midline of the occipital part of clivus. This fossa was first described by Tourtual. Its prevalence ranges from 0.9 to 5.3%.

Structure 
Fossa navicularis magna is located on the anterior surface or pharyngeal surface of the clivus. Its position when present is between the spheno-occipital synchondrosis and the foramen magnum. Size of this fossa varies considerably and its depth ranges from 3.49 to 4.94 mm. A histological study reported the presence of loose connective tissue containing collagen and elastic fibers within the fossa navicularis magna.

Development 
Two theories have been proposed to explain the formation of fossa navicularis magna. It is believed that the fossa is formed as a remnant of the notochord or residue of the channels for emissary veins.

Clinical significance 
Different pathologies were found associated with fossa navicularis magna including cancers, adenoid hypertrophy, ecchordosis physaliphora, Tornwaldt cyst and Rathke cleft cyst.

See also 

 Craniopharyngeal canal
 Clivus

References 

Anatomical variations
Human anatomy
Skull
Bones of the head and neck